The Twin Mounds Site (15BA2 and 15BA14), also known as the Nolan Site, is a Mississippian culture archaeological site located near Barlow in Ballard County, Kentucky, just north of the confluence of the Ohio and Mississippi Rivers, and directly across the Ohio River from Mound City, Illinois.

Site
Principal occupation of the site was from 1200 to about 1450 CE during the Mississippian Dorena and Medley phases of the local chronology, although some pottery from the preceding Late Woodland period was also found during excavations at the site. For most of its history, it was contemporaneous with another local site, Wickliffe Mounds, which is several miles to the southeast. It is thought that when Wickliffe was slowly abandoned around 1300, the population had been slowly relocating to the Twin Mounds Site.

Art

A rare Cahokia human effigy pipe was found during excavations at the site. It is carved from Missouri flint clay (a variety of easily carved red pipestone only found in eastern Missouri across the Mississippi River from the American Bottom) and measures  in height. It depicts a crouching nude male figure slightly leaning forward and sitting on a small pedestal, similar in design to the "Chunkey player" figurine found at the Hughes Site in Muskogee County, Oklahoma. Many of the male Cahokian flint clay figurines have been associated with the Red Horn mythic cycle of the  Siouan oral traditions, although it is unclear which episode of the stories the "Crouching figure" may represent. In 2004 the figurine was loaned to the Art Institute of Chicago for the "Hero, Hawk, and Open Hand: American Indian Art of the Ancient Midwest and South" exhibition from the private collection of Tommy Beutell.

See also
 Kincaid Mounds
 Obion Mounds
 Towosahgy
 Ware Mounds and Village Site

References

External links
 Twin Mounds effigy pipe

Middle Mississippian culture
Mounds in Kentucky
Native American history of Kentucky
Archaeological sites in Kentucky
Buildings and structures in Ballard County, Kentucky